Walum is an unincorporated community in Griggs County, in the U.S. state of North Dakota.

History
A post office called Walum was established in 1904, and remained in operation until 1973. The community was named for Marinus Wallum, an early settler.

References

Unincorporated communities in Griggs County, North Dakota
Unincorporated communities in North Dakota